Andrei Năstase (born 6 August 1975) is a Moldovan politician serving as Deputy Prime Minister and Minister of Internal Affairs from 8 June 2019 to 12 November 2019. He was member of Parliament of Moldova in 2019. Năstase has been leader of Dignity and Truth Platform Party (Platforma DA) from 2015 to 2021.

Năstase was selected as joint candidate of pro-European Platforma DA and PAS parties and won the runoff of the 2018 Chișinău mayoral snap election with 52.57% of the votes, outrunning pro-Russian PSRM candidate, Ion Ceban. However, the elections were later invalidated, which caused widespread criticism from the EU and US.

In the 2019 parliamentary election, Năstase's Platforma DA together with its ally, PAS led by Maia Sandu formed the ACUM Electoral Bloc and  secured 26 of the 101 seats in the Parliament of Moldova. On June 8, during the 2019 constitutional crisis, Andrei Năstase was appointed Deputy Prime Minister and Minister of Internal Affairs in the Sandu cabinet. On November 12, 2019, Sandu's government has been resigned because of the motion of no confidence. Năstase criticised Sandu's decision to assume responsibility for overruling its own contest rules for the appointment of the General Prosecutor. The Constitutional Court later decided that Sandu's decision was illegal.

Biography 
Born on August 6, 1975, in the village of Mîndrești, nowadays in Telenești district, he is the son of Andrei and Anna Năstase. Between 1982 and 1992 Năstase has studied at the Mîndrești school, from 1992 until 1993 he has studied at the Faculty of History-Geography of the Ștefan cel Mare University of Suceava, Romania, and between 1993 and 1997 he studied at the Faculty of Law of the Alexandru Ioan Cuza University of Iași, Romania.

Professional activity
From 1997 to 2000, Năstase worked as a prosecutor, employed at the Office of the Chișinău Prosecutor of Transport, initially as interim aid, then as assistant to the transport prosecutor. Not much information about his work in this position is available. In a reply sent to RISE Moldova following an enquiry, the General Prosecutor's Office stated that "in the archives, some documents set up by the assistant of the transport prosecutor, Andrei Năstase, regarding inspections of several aspects of the activity of civil aviation enterprises, including the state enterprise Air Moldova, have been identified". According to the reply of the General Prosecutor's Office, "although, following the controls, a number of derogations were established in the activity of Air Moldova (subordinated to the State Civil Aviation Administration, headed in that period by Victor Țopa), no prosecutor's reaction has been taken on detected violations".
Test

From 2000 to 2002, Năstase worked as a deputy director of the Moldovan-German Joint Undertaking Air Moldova S.R.L. During this time, Air Moldova has been transformed from a state-owned enterprise into a joint venture, a procedure which has drawn accusations of unlawfulnesses from political analyst Victor Gurău. According to him, the company's shares were taken over by a so-called foreign investor, which had no accounts and did not meet the minimum requirements to form an undertaking. He claimed that Năstase, together with former Prime Minister Vlad Filat, businessmen Victor Țopa and Viorel Țopa and former Finance Minister Anatol Arapu were involved in the privatization of Air Moldova.

Political activity
In early 2015, Năstase, along with several opinion leaders, journalists, lawyers, political scientists, ambassadors, and others, participated at the foundation of the Civic Platform Dignity and Truth. He is also one of the leaders of the protest movement in Moldova in September 2015. On 1 November 2015, he was elected President of the Executive Bureau of the Initiative Group set up to organize the Republican referendum amending the Constitution with regard to the election and direct dismissal of the president by the people, the limitation of parliamentary immunity and the number of deputies from 101 to 71. Năstase has also drafted laws that were subsequently examined and positively endorsed by the Constitutional Court. In December 2015, a part of the Dignity and Truth Platform members, including Năstase, joined the People's Force Party. At the extraordinary congress on 13 December 2015, the party was renamed to Dignity and Truth Platform Party (Partidul Politic "Platforma Demnitate și Adevăr", Platforma DA), elected new governing bodies, and Năstase was elected as party chairman.

2016 presidential election
Andrei Năstase was appointed by the Political National Council of the Dignity and Truth Platform Party to run in the 2016 presidential elections. He was registered on 18 September 2016 as a candidate, the fourth officially registered with the Central Electoral Commission (CEC) for the elections of 30 October 2016. On October 15, 2016, Andrei Năstase officially announced his withdrawal from the race and endorsed Action and Solidarity Party candidate Maia Sandu.

2018 Chișinău mayoral election
At the 2018 Chișinău mayoral election, after finishing second in the first round with 32.1%, Năstase gained 52.57% of the total number of votes in the runoff, beating Ion Ceban (47.43%). However, on 19 June 2018, the elections were declared void on the grounds of violation of election silence on election day by both candidates, contrary to the provisions of the Electoral Code. As such, the mandate of the elected mayor, Andrei Năstase, was not validated by the magistrates of the Center Sector Court in Chișinău, a decision maintained on 21 June 2018 by the Chișinău Court of Appeal, as well as by the Supreme Court of Justice (SCJ), which, on 25 June 2018, gave the final verdict on the validation of the results of the Chișinău elections. On June 29, 2018, the Central Electoral Commission (CEC) also declared void the local elections held in the capital city. Năstase regarded the decision as politically motivated and considered it to be ordered by Vladimir Plahotniuc. Following this decision, the mayor of Chișinău will be elected in the 2019 Moldovan local elections and the mayoralty will be headed by an interim mayor.

On October 8, 2019, the Chișinău Court of Appeal has validated the Andrei Nastase's mandate by overturning the ruling issued by the Chișinău Court that annulled the local elections held in 2018.

Parliamentary Assembly of the Council of Europe, 2019
At the Parliamentary Assembly of the Council of Europe (PACE), carried out on June 24–28, 2019, the Republic of Moldova has been represented by Andrei Năstase (head of the Moldovan delegation) – Platforma DA, Vlad Batrîncea – PSRM and Mihai Popșoi – PAS. From the Republic of Moldova side,  votes in favour of Russia's delegation reinstatement  to this institution (the sanction imposed before to Russian because of Crimea annexation to Russian Federation and implication into the rebel conflict in the eastern  Ukrainina region), came from Andrei Năstase and Vlad Batrîncea. Andrei Nastase was deeply criticized for that decision. His colleague, Alexandr Slusari, the deputy chairman of the DA Platform, has stated that "Most probably it was a hard decision. I personally won’t have voted". Ex mayor Dorin Chirtoacă has criticized the vote granted by Andrei Năstase, asking his resignation: "When last year, Nastase has stated that: "Unification is a stupidity", putting us in a bad light in face of Romania, today it puts us in a state of tension with Ukraine and,  asked by nobody, plays along for the Russian Federation. The resignation, Mr. Năstase! You are now in too many position. The resignation from the PACE, the Parliament, the Government, the MAI, from ACUM, from the Platforma DA and with a self-report in hand, please go to the investigation bodies, after they are reformed, to clear out the privatization of "Air Moldova "happened in 2000 and raider attack of" Victoriabank "in 2005." The spokesman of the Ministry of External Affairs and European Integration, Alexandru Roitman, has said that the vote within PACE of the Moldovan's officials does not represent the country or the Government position "moreover, the Executive does not have the prerogative to recommend to the MPs how to vote".

2019 Chișinău mayoral election
On September 21, 2019, Andrei Năstase has launched the election campaign for the general local elections of 20 October 2019, by ACUM Bloc, formed by PAS and Platforma DA parties. Valeriu Munteanu, his electoral rival and the leader of the Save Bessarabia Union (USB) has instituted a proceedings against him, because he would infringe the electoral legislation by printing the pictures of Stephen III of Moldavia and the City Hall on his promotional leaflets. By the Ruling of October the 5th, 2019 issued by the Chișinău Court of Râșcani District of Chișinău, Andrei Năstase, the candidate for the position of the general mayor of the Chișinău municipality, delegated by ACUM Electoral Bloc "Dignity and Truth Platform and PAS", was obligated to exclude the picture, information/leaflet that contain the public authority – the City Hall of the Chișinău and historical personalities "Stephen III of Moldavia" and as well,  it was prohibited to use the electoral material/leaflet in  electioneering and to unmake the remained stock.

In the first round of the elections on General Mayor position of Chișinău of October 20, 2019, Andrei Năstase gained 31,08% of votes, and his rival Ion Ceban - 40,19%.

In the second round of the elections for the position of the General Mayor of Chișinău of November the 3rd, 2019 Andrei Nastase accumulated 47,61% of votes. Although, he was confident  of his victory, Andrei Nastase lost to Ion Ceban who gained 52,39% of votes.

Personal life
Năstase is married to Angela Năstase and has three children. His brother, Vasile Năstase, is a journalist, former MP of the first parliament of Moldova, and one of the people who has signed the Declaration of Independence of Moldova. Năstase is the godson of the businessman Victor Țopa.

Controversies
As a lawyer, he is known for defending various domestic and foreign investors in national and international courts, such as the German company Unistar, but also those of businessmen Viorel and Victor Topa. This was used in a long-standing smear campaign against Năstase, portraying the two businessmen as fugitive cousins, despite the two being unrelated. The smear campaign was conducted via the media holdings owned by oligarch Vlad Plahotniuc. A Rise imvestigation sheds light on the real reason why Plahotniuc wanted Năstase labelled as  "The Man of Țopas". Viorel Topa and Victor Topa were illegally stripped of their assets at Victoriabank by Plahotniuc, then blackmailed and forced to seek refuge in Germany. German authorities refuse to extradite them arguing that the Topa's cases are classed as political persecution.

Media owned by Plahotniuc wrote that the Open Dialogue Foundation, led by activist Lyudmyla Kozlovska and allegedly funded by Kazakh businessman and politician Muhtar Abliazov, has paid for flight tickets to Brussels for Năstase and Maia Sandu. They claim the two have benefited from funding from the foundation without properly declaring it. Kozlovska was politically persecuted by Plahotniuc's PD, later dropped after Plahotniuc fled Moldova upon losing the parliamentary majority in the 2019 elections.

According to statements made by the Liberal Party leader, Dorin Chirtoacă, Năstase would have harmed Moldova with a loss worth €7 million. He refers to the involvement of Andrei Nastase in the privatization of state company Air Moldova, through which the German company Unistar Ventures, allegedly managed by Victor Țopa, acquired 49% of the airline's shares. This is, in fact, Andrei Năstase winning the case at the European Court of Human Rights, who forced Moldova to pay back material damages caused to the plaintiffs.

At Andrei Năstase request, appointed as Minister of the Ministry of the Internal Affairs, Gheorge Balan, a former judge known for his criticism against corruption in the judiciary during Plahotniuc's rule, has been appointed as interim Head of the General Police Inspectorate at the first meeting of the new Government, when Alexandru Pînzari was dismissed. Later, Andrei Năstase has introduced the new interim head of the GPI, who has invited his subordinates to the parliament. Soon after, Năstase confirmed that him and Gheorghe Balan are in kinship affinity relations (one of several godparents) but that he is qualified to continue as interim Head until the recruitment process finalises. Soon after, the Sandu Cabinet was voted out which had a ripple effect across all institution appointments. Gheorghe Balan  has recognized that he and Andrei Năstase a in affinity relations (are the godparents).  The newly appointed Minister of Internal Affairs has stated to the media "that the affinity that is having Mr. Balan did not have anything in common with his appointment for the position of the acting head of the GPI… shortly after a competition will be arranged."

On February 21, 2019, Andrei Năstase and the candidates of the ACUM electoral bloc, both of the national and uninominal constituency, have signed the public commitment according to which after Parliamentary elections of February 24, 2019 they would not  make any coalition with the Party of Socialists, Democratic Party and Shor Party, and if this commitment will be violated they resign from as MPs mandate. After PAS made the unilateral decision to coalise with PSRM to oust Plahotniuc, Platforma DA agreed to accept PSRM votes for the Sandu Cabiet, but insisted on a series of public commitments and anti-oligarchic laws package.

References 

1975 births
Living people
People from Telenești District
Alexandru Ioan Cuza University alumni
Moldovan lawyers
Mayors of Chișinău
Members of the parliament of Moldova
Moldovan Ministers of the Interior
Deputy Prime Ministers of Moldova